Paul Campbell (born 11 February 1968) is a New Zealand former cricketer. He played three first-class matches for Otago between 1989 and 1995.

Campbell was born at Dunedin in 1968 and was educated at Kings High School. His father, Keith Campbell played cricket for Otago and New Zealand.

References

External links
 

1968 births
Living people
New Zealand cricketers
Otago cricketers
Cricketers from Dunedin